Josie and the Pussycats (sometimes simply known as The Pussycats) are a fictional girl group rock band created by Dan DeCarlo.

Appearances
They have been featured in a number of different media since the 1960s:
Josie and the Pussycats (comics), also titled She's Josie or Josie, a comic book produced by Archie Comics from 1963 to 1982 and 2016 to present
Josie and the Pussycats (TV series) (1970–1972), a Saturday morning cartoon produced by Hanna-Barbera Productions; modified and retitled Josie and the Pussycats in Outer Space (1972–1974)
Josie and the Pussycats (1970s band), bubblegum pop music group that recorded songs for the TV show, and their self-titled 1970 Capitol Records LP
Josie and the Pussycats (film), a live-action motion picture released in 2001

 
Fictional musical groups